This article provides the list of deceased Maraji (plural of Marja, the supreme legal authority or the source of emulation), both current and deceased, followed by Twelver (also known as Imamiyyah) Shia Muslims around the world. The concept of a Marja-i Taqlid (lit. source of emulation) is central to Usuli Shi'a Islam. Marja-i Taqlids provide religious interpretations on matters of law and rituals. Among the functions of Marja-i Taqlids is the collection and distribution of religious taxes (zakat and khums).

Deceased 

Note: The names are ordered by date of death (descending) as an arbitrary standard.

Till 350 AH/960 CE
Following are ulema (who may or may not be considered maraji) who have spent their major life spans before 350 AH/960 CE:

351 AH/961 CE to 1200 AH/1785 CE
Following are ulema who have spent their major life span between 350 AH/961 CE & 1200 AH/1785 CE:

Between 1201 AH/1786 CE and 1300 AH/1883 CE 
Following are ulema (who may or may not be considered maraji) who have spent their major life span after 1201 AH/1785 CE & 1300 AH/1883 CE:

Between 1900-1980 CE (1318-1400 AH)
Following are ulema (who may or may not be considered maraji) who have spent their major life span after 1301 AH/1884 CE to 1400 AH/1980 CE:

After 1980 CE (1400 AH)
Following are ulema (who may or may not be considered maraji) who have spent their major life span after 1400 AH/1980 CE:

See also
List of current Maraji
List of Ayatollahs
Marja
Ijtihad
Ayatollah
Society of Seminary Teachers of Qom

References

External links
 Prominent Ulamaa, prior to 100 years
 ULAMAA - TIMELINE
 Comprehensive List of Ulamaa / Jurists & their books ' An Extract from A Shiite Encyclopedia - Hasan Amini
 Indian Ulamaa list
 Leading Luminaries (ahl-ul-bayt.org)
 Ulamaa Biography (imamreza.net)
 Ulamaa Biography (imamreza.net)
 Ulamaa Biographies (Jafariyanews.com)
 Introduction to Scholars 5th / 11th century (al-islam.org)
 Scholars Info (Playandlearn.org)

Lists of Muslims
Shia clerics